"Rough..." is the final single from the American hip-hop artist Queen Latifah's 1993 album, Black Reign. The song features rappers KRS-One, Treach and Heavy D. Although the song was released as a Cassette single, Promo CD single and a 12" Promo vinyl single, a video was never shot, nor did the song receive any radio play. Due to the lyrical content, the single received a Parental Advisory sticker. The 12" Promo vinyl single is a double single, which includes "I Can't Understand"
another single from Black Reign.

In 1995, the American rapper Nine sampled KRS-One's vocals from the song on his single "Ova Confident".

Track listing
 Radio Edit (4:13)
 LP Version (5:04)
 Radio Edit Censored (4:13)
 Instrumental (5:02)

1993 singles
1993 songs
Motown singles
Queen Latifah songs
Song articles with missing songwriters